Pemba Airport  is an airport in the Zanzibar Archipelago located on Pemba Island. It is also known as Karume Airport and Wawi Airport. The Zanzibar government is looking into the possibility of renaming the airport to Thabit Kombo Jecha in recognition of his role in the Zanzibar Revolution.

The Pemba non-directional beacon (Ident: PA) is located on the field.

Airlines and destinations

Accidents and Incidents
 On 24 January 2014, a ZanAir LET-410 skidded off the runway on landing and impacted a group of bushes, causing substantial damage. There were no reported injuries, and the cause was determined to be a brake failure.

See also

 List of airports in Tanzania
 Transport in Tanzania

References

External links

 
 

Airports in Zanzibar
Pemba Island